Rebuildingsociety.com is a Leeds-based peer-to-peer lending platform, founded in 2012 by Daniel Rajkumar, to facilitate the online arranging of finance between lenders and small and medium-sized enterprises. The first loans were completed in February 2013.

Since early 2021 Rebuilding Society has been subject of FCA investigations and some of its activities have been suspended.

Operation
The Rebuildingsociety.com website operates as a lending platform by allowing approved businesses to publish a loan application. Investors can subscribe to parts of the loan after assessing the business's information, committing an amount of their choice, with an interest rate of their choice.

Rebuildingsociety.com was one of the early peer-to-peer lending platforms to have launched in the UK prior to the regulation of the industry. Research by Rebuildingsociety.com in late 2013 found SME owners were still largely unaware of peer-to-business lending and rely on personal borrowing to support their businesses. According to the study, about 290,000 SME owners would use their personal credit cards to raise money, similar numbers will borrow from friends and family, and about 500,000 SME owners will be remortgaging their own home.

Regulatory Enforcement 
Since 26th of February 2021 all appointed representatives have been closed to new regulated business.  This limits what activities the company can do and may lead to further enforcement actions or restrictions.

Potential returns
Because investors choose which businesses and at what rate they lend, returns can vary considerably.

As of 12 January 2014, the average interest rate payable to lenders from 25 loans completed was 15.57% gross. Earnings are reduced by any defaults which are forecast to be up to 7% depending on the risk appetite of the lender.

Regulation
   
The Financial Conduct Authority undertook to regulate the peer-to-peer lending industry from April 2014. With assistance from Kylie-Jo Greeff, Richard Farr and Jay Tikam, Rebuilding Society participated in responding to various consultation papers to help shape the regulatory framework for the industry.

As of 22 February 2017, Rebuilding Society transitioned from interim permission to full FCA authorisation, with the following permissions:
 Operating an electronic system in relation to lending
 Client money

Pensions and ISAs

In 2014, the UK government announced it was considering setting up a separate type of tax-free individual savings account (ISA) for people who want to lend out money. The new ISA would be for people who lend money via peer-to-peer borrowing sites.

Rebuilding Society opened IFISA (innovative finance ISA) pre-registrations in March 2017.

In January 2015, Rebuildingsociety.com announced a new partnership with SIPPclub, which will allow qualifying Rebuilding Society investors to invest through a specially-designed self-invested personal pension (SIPP). The platform’s investors will be able to invest via an EvolutionSIPP. All investments made through a SIPP are tax-free – meaning participating investors will stand to recoup higher rates of interest through the Rebuilding Society platform.

Growth and maturity
The UK industry is set for rapid growth as one in four savers is ready to invest according to industry research undertaken by Rebuildingsociety.com.

Non-bank lending grew at its fastest rate since 2008 in the year to October 2013, with over £10.5bn of credit arranged through peer-to-peer lending, invoice discounting, asset finance and leasing. Rebuildingsociety.com passed the £1m of lending mark in October 2013 

As of 14 August 2014, total advances stood at around £3.5m, while in January 2015 it passed £5m of loans completed. In August 2016, total lending surpassed £10.4m,

Council Partnerships

In February 2018, the firm began a partnership with its Leeds City Council to provide funding to other Leeds based businesses.

Awards and commendations 
Rebuildingsociety has achieved the following awards since launch including:

In November 2019, Rebuildingsociety.com received a five-star rating in the first "Loan Based Crowdfunding" analysis by financial sector analyst Defaqto.
CEO, Daniel Rajkumar is named in the Peer-to-Peer Finance News Power 50.

Trade associations

The firm is a member of:

 European Crowdfunding Network
 UKCFA
 Federation of Small Businesses

Technology

Rebuildingsociety.com also offers a licensed version of its technology to other businesses looking to break into the peer-to-peer lending industry through White Label Crowdfunding. In August 2013 it announced its first three clients.

References

External links
 Rebuildingsociety.com website 
 Financial Services Register entry
 P2P Independent Forum
 Loanbook Performance Statistics

Peer-to-peer lending companies
British companies established in 2012
Companies based in Leeds